Mohammad Ashouri Taziani (Persian: محمد آشوری تازیانی; born in 1962 in Bandar Abbas, Iran) is a politician and member of the 7th, 8th, 9th, 10th, 11th terms of the Iranian Islamic parliament.

See also 
 List of Iran's parliament representatives (11th term)
 List of Iran's parliament representatives (10th term)
 List of Iran's parliament representatives (9th term)
 List of Iran's parliament representatives (8th term)
 List of Iran's parliament representatives (7th term)

References 

Iranian politicians
1962 births
Living people
Members of the 7th Islamic Consultative Assembly
Members of the 8th Islamic Consultative Assembly
Members of the 9th Islamic Consultative Assembly
Members of the 10th Islamic Consultative Assembly
Members of the 11th Islamic Consultative Assembly